Tar-Vabriga is a municipality in the Istria County, Croatia, approximately 7 km north of Poreč. The municipality has been established in 2006.

The municipality is composed of the following six villages:
 Frata
 Gedići
 Perci
 Rošini
 Tar 
 Vabriga

References

Municipalities of Croatia
Populated places in Istria County
Italian-speaking territorial units in Croatia